The U.S. Open (squash) is the most prestigious squash tournament in the United States, and one of the most significant in the world. It is a major international display of supreme talent in the sport, and showcases the top players from around the world. 

From 2011 through 2019 the U.S. Open squash championships were held at Drexel University in Philadelphia, Pennsylvania. 

The event forms part of the World Series for both the Professional Squash Association (PSA) and the Women's Squash Association (WSA), and is organized by the national governing body for squash in the United States, U.S. Squash.  

The championship was inaugurated in 1954 as an opportunity for professionals and amateurs to compete against each other.  Prior to the mid-1980s, the tournament was held using the hardball squash format (a North American version of squash, which uses a smaller court and a faster-moving ball than the international "softball" version).  In 1966, the championship merged with the Canadian Open and became the North American Open. The North American Open continued to use the hardball format and came to establish itself as the most prestigious event in the hardball game. In 1985, the United States Open was reinstituted as a "softball" squash event using the international format. A separate North American Open competition has continued to run as a hardball event.

The first championship final in 1954 saw the Boston amateur player Henri Salaun defeat the great Pakistani player Hashim Khan in Hashim's first foray to North America. Subsequently the championship came to be dominated by members of the Khan family for the next three decades. Hashim won the title three times between 1956 and 1963. His son Sharif Khan then captured the title a record 12 times in the 13-year period between 1969 and 1981. Four other members of their extended family also won the championship – Roshan Khan (three titles), Azam Khan (one title), Mo Khan (three titles), and Jahangir Khan (three titles – one hardball and two softball). Sharif's younger brother Aziz Khan also finished runner-up in 1981. Another Khan, Jansher Khan, also won three titles in the 1980s and 1990s. Jansher's last win in 1995 marks the last time that a Pakistani player won the title. In recent years, players from the United Kingdom, Australia and Canada have enjoyed success at the event.

Men's championship

United States Open Championship (softball, 1985–present)

North American Open Championship (hardball, 1966–1984)

United States Open Championship (hardball, 1954–1965)

Men's champions by country

Women's championship

United States Open Championship (softball, 1966–present)

Women's champions by country

See also 
 North American Open
 U.S. Squash
 US Junior Open squash championship
 British Open Squash
 World Open

Note 
1 The 2001 United States Open was played in January 2002 as the Memorial Open in honor of those who died in the September 11 2001 attacks. The event was scheduled to take place in September 2001, but was postponed following the attacks.

References

External links 
 U.S. Open Squash website
 USsquash.com tournament list
 Historical information at squashtalk.com

Squash tournaments in the United States
Squash in the United States
Squash in Pennsylvania